Veronica Shanti Pereira (born 20 September 1996) is a Singaporean track and field athlete who specialises in the 100 metres, 200 metres, 4 x 100 metres relay, and 4 x 400 metres relay. She holds the national records for the 100 metres (11.46s) and 200 metres (23.46s).

Career

Pereira set a number of records in her youth. She holds the U-23 records for the 100 metres (11.80s) and 200 metres (23.99s) and was a member of the teams which set the records for the 4 x 100 metres (46.64s) and 4 x 400 metres (3:44.80) relays; the U-19 records for the 100 metres (11.89s) and 200 metres (23.99s); the U-17 records for the 100 metres (12.21s) and 200 metres (24.92s); and U-15 records for the 100 metres (12.68s).

In 2013, Pereira became the first female Singaporean to run the 100 metres in under 12 seconds when she clocked 11.89s at the 2013 World Youth Championships in Athletics in Donetsk, Ukraine. At the 2013 Southeast Asian Games, she came in fourth in the 100 metres final. In 2014, she became the first female Singaporean to run the 200 metres in under 24 seconds when she clocked 23.99s at the Asian Junior Athletics Championships.

At the 2015 Southeast Asian Games, Pereira won the bronze medal in the 100 metres with a time of 11.88s, Singapore's first medal in the event in 42 years. She also won the gold medal in the 200 metres with a time of 23.60s, rewriting the national record she had set in the day's heats (23.82s); this was Singapore's first gold medal in a sprint event in 42 years. Although the Singapore quartet which she was part of came in fourth in the 4 x 400 metres relay, it broke the oldest record in Singapore's athletics history with a time of 3:40.58. In her final event, the 4 x 100 metres relay, the team came in fourth, but set a new national record of 45.41s.

At the 2017 Southeast Asian Games, Pereira won the bronze medal in both the 100 and 200 metres; she repeated this feat at the 2019 Southeast Asian Games.

In 2021, Pereira qualified for the 200 metres in the 2020 Summer Olympics through universality places. She finished 6th in her heat with a season-best timing of 23.96s.

At the 2021 Southeast Asian Games, Pereira won the gold medal at the 200 metres with a time of 23.52s, rewriting the national record she had set in the 2015 Southeast Asian Games. In the 100 metres, she won the silver medal, clocking 11.62s.

At the 2022 Commonwealth Games, Pereira clocked 11.48s in the 100m heats, breaking her previous record of 11.58s set in 2019. However, her timing of 11.57s in the next round was unable to earn her qualification for the final. In the 200m, she also broke her previous record with a time of 23.46s. She clocked the same time in the semifinal, placing 11th overall among 24 runners.

On 3 March 2023, Pereira clocked 11.46s in the 100m heats of the New Zealand Track and Field Championships to break her own record yet again. While she ran 11.44s to win the bronze in the final, this was not recognised as a record due to the strong tailwind (3.4m/s).

Education
Pereira studied for a diploma in sports and leisure management offered jointly by Republic Polytechnic and Singapore Sports School. In 2017, she was awarded the Yip Pin Xiu Scholarship to study accountancy at Singapore Management University.

References

External links
 

1996 births
Singaporean female sprinters
Athletes (track and field) at the 2014 Asian Games
Athletes (track and field) at the 2018 Asian Games
Commonwealth Games competitors for Singapore
Athletes (track and field) at the 2014 Commonwealth Games
Living people
World Athletics Championships athletes for Singapore
Southeast Asian Games medalists in athletics
Southeast Asian Games gold medalists for Singapore
Southeast Asian Games bronze medalists for Singapore
Competitors at the 2015 Southeast Asian Games
Competitors at the 2017 Southeast Asian Games
Asian Games competitors for Singapore
Competitors at the 2019 Southeast Asian Games
Athletes (track and field) at the 2020 Summer Olympics
Olympic athletes of Singapore
Competitors at the 2021 Southeast Asian Games
Athletes (track and field) at the 2022 Commonwealth Games
21st-century Singaporean women